was a Japanese calligrapher, pedagogue and recipient of the Order of Culture, the Nara Prefecture Culture Award, The Minister Of Education Award Nitten, The Japan Art Academy Award, and in 2000, the Sugioka Calligraphy Museum was opened in Gango-ji – an UNESCO world heritage  site.

Early life
Sugioka was born in Yoshino-gun village in Shimokitayama, Nara. He continued to study calligraphy immediately after graduation from high school. Sugioka received his teaching certificate from the Osaka Kyoiku University, then studied literature and aesthetics at Kyoto University and afterwards learned the art of zen from Shin'ichi Hisamatsu.

Career
Sugioka exhibited regularly at Nitten and other exhibitions and was regularly published in the Yomiuri Shimbun. He also had many students and published books.

Books
 Kanasho no Bi o Hiraku: Sho to Hito (1998)
 Kanasho no Bi Chirashi no Sekai (2000)
 Daihyosaku ni miru Kason Rokujunen no Ayumi (Narashi Sugioka Kason Shodo Bijutsukan Kaikan Kinen) (2000)
 Yamato no Uta Man yo no Uta (Narashi Sugioka Kason Shodo Bijutsukan Kaikan Kinen Tokubetsuten) (2001)
 Kana no Miyabi: Kason no Hosoji  (2001)
 Kokoro no Sho: Kason no Chuji Daiji (Narashi Sugioka Kason Shodo Bijutsukan Kaikan Kinen Tokubetsuten Dai 5ki) (2001)

References

External links
 Nara City Kason Sugioka Museum of Calligraphy
 Nitten - The Japan Fine Arts Exhibition

1913 births
2012 deaths
Japanese calligraphers
Japanese Zen Buddhists
Kyoto University alumni
Recipients of the Order of Culture
Artists from Nara Prefecture
20th-century Japanese artists
21st-century Japanese artists